Halefoğlu is a belde (town) in the central district (Kars) of Kars Province, Turkey at . The population of Halefoğlu  is 2597 as of 2011. With this population it is the most populous village of the province. There are also some Halefoğlu residents working in big cities. The economy of the town depends on agriculture and cattle breeding. There is also a dairy in the village

References

Populated places in Kars Province
Towns in Turkey
Kars Central District